

Lovely Lane United Methodist Church, formerly known as First Methodist Episcopal Church and earlier founded as Lovely Lane Chapel, is a historic United Methodist church located at Baltimore, Maryland, United States.

The building on St. Paul Street and 22nd Streets in the Charles Village (then originally named "Peabody Heights") neighborhood in the northern area of the city, was designed by renowned New York City architect Stanford White, (1853–1906) in the Romanesque Revival style, and completed in 1884, as the "Centennial Monument of American Methodism". It is patterned after the early churches and basilicas in Ravenna, Italy. The exterior is constructed of a gray ashlar granite with limited ornamentation.  It features a square bell tower patterned after the campanile of the 12th century church of Santa Maria, Abbey of Pomposa, near Ravenna. The pulpit is a reproduction of the one at St. Apollinaris, in Ravenna.

Locally influential architect Charles L. Carson was supervising architect for the McKim, Mead & White firm from New York City during construction of the church. Lovely Lane Methodist Church was listed on the National Register of Historic Places in 1973.

Lovely Lane Chapel
The congregation is known as the "Mother Church of American Methodism."
The original Lovely Lane Chapel or Meeting House was the scene of the December 1784 "Christmas Conference", at which the Methodist Episcopal Church in the United States was founded and Francis Asbury and Thomas Coke were ordained as its first bishops.

The plain original chapel on Lovely Lane, off German (now Redwood) Street, between South Calvert Street and South Street in the city's waterfront district, was abandoned in 1786 and demolished. It was replaced (first) by an elaborate beaux-arts structure of the Merchants Club, and now the building contains a restaurant as well as offices and teaching space used by Chesapeake Shakespeare Company.

Gallery

References

External links

, including photo from 2004, at Maryland Historical Trust
Lovely Lane United Methodist Church website
Lovely Lane United Methodist Church – Explore Baltimore Heritage

Churches in Baltimore
United Methodist churches in Maryland
Properties of religious function on the National Register of Historic Places in Baltimore
Churches completed in 1884
19th-century Methodist church buildings in the United States
Northern Baltimore
Churches on the National Register of Historic Places in Maryland
Methodist Episcopal churches in the United States
Baltimore City Landmarks